Grace Barbé is a Seychellois born, Australian singer-songwriter from Western Australia who also performs with the Afrobeat and psychedelic band of the same name which includes Jamie Searle (guitar, music director and producer), Dan Carroll (studio engineer, mixer, guitar) and Joelle Barbé (drums). Barbé has released three studio albums and is the recipient of thirteen West Australian Music Industry Awards, including ten Best World Act Awards and three WAM Song of the Year awards. Barbé's third album Fanm: Woman was nominated for Best World Album at the 2020 ARIA Music Awards.
Barbé sings in Creole, English, French and Malagasy and her music fuses the tropical rhythms and dances of the slaves with psychedelic rock, afrobeat, reggae and pop.

Early life
Grace Barbé was born in the Mahe, Seychelles Her first experience of Australia came at the age of six, when her mother received a scholarship to study at the University of Perth. The family returned to Seychelles at the end of her mother's studies, when Grace was 12. Grace moved permanently to Australia at 16 years of age with her mother, sister and twin brothers and she commenced performing for the Seychellois community living in Perth.

Career

2005–present: Solo albums
In 2006, Grace Barbe, James Searle won World/Folk Song for "Mon Ankor Anmourer" at the WAM Song of the Year.
 
Grace Barbé released her debut single "Mon Arive" in 2007, which received significant airplay, reaching the number one spot on the Triple J Unearthed Roots chart.
 
In December 2008, Barbé released the debut studio album, Kreol Daughter. The album was launched at Fly By nightclub in Fremantle and was supported by a tour where Barbé and band appeared at major events including the Australasian World Music Expo, Island Vibe, Queenscliff Blue Mountains Music Festival, Bellengen Global Carnival and Darwin and Perth International Arts Festivals.

Welele! was released digitally in November 2013 and on CD in August 2014.
 
In May 2019, Barbé released the third studio album, Fanm: Woman. The album was nominated for Best World Album at the 2020 ARIA Music Awards.

Discography

Albums

Extended plays

Awards and nominations

ARIA Music Awards
The ARIA Music Awards is an annual awards ceremony that recognises excellence, innovation, and achievement across all genres of Australian music.
 

|-
| 2020
| Fanm: Woman
| ARIA Award for Best World Music Album
| 
|-

National Live Music Awards
The National Live Music Awards are a broad recognition of Australia's diverse and successful live industry, celebrating the diversity and success of the Australian live scene. They commenced in 2016.
 

|-
| 2020
| Grace Barbé
|Live Bassist of the Year
| 
|-

WAM Song of the Year
The WAM Song of the Year was formed by the Western Australian Rock Music Industry Association Inc. (WARMIA) in 1985, with its main aim to develop and run annual awards recognising achievements within the music industry in Western Australia.

|-
| 2006
| "Mon Ankor Anmourer" by Grace Barbé and James Searle
| World/Folk song of the Year
| 
|-
| 2014
| "Fatige" by Grace Barbé  
| World/Folk song of the Year
| 
|-
| 2020
| "Mardilo" by Grace Barbé  
| Global song of the Year
| 
|-

West Australian Music Industry Awards
The West Australian Music Industry Awards (WAMIs) are annual awards presented to the local contemporary music industry, put on annually by the Western Australian Music Industry Association Inc (WAM). Barbé has won thirteen awards.
 
 (wins only)
|-
| scope="row"| 2009
| Best World Act
| Grace Barbé
| 
|-
| scope="row"| 2010
| Best World Act
| Grace Barbé
| 
|-
| scope="row"| 2011
| Best World Act
| Grace Barbé
| 
|-
| scope="row"| 2012
| Best World Act
| Grace Barbé
| 
|-
| scope="row"| 2013
| Best World Act
| Grace Barbé
| 
|-
| scope="row"| 2015
| Best World Act
| Grace Barbé
| 
|-
| scope="row"| 2016
| Best World Act
| Grace Barbé
| 
|-
| scope="row"| 2018
| Best World Act
| Grace Barbé
| 
|-
| rowspan=2| 2019
| Best World Act
| Grace Barbé
| 
|-
| Best Vocalist
| Grace Barbé
| 
|-
| rowspan=3|  2020
| Best World Act
| Grace Barbé
| 
|-
| Best Vocalist
| Grace Barbé
| 
|-
| Best Bassist
| Grace Barbé
| 
|-
|}

References

21st-century Australian women singers
21st-century Australian singers
Australian women singer-songwriters
Living people
Year of birth missing (living people)